This article is list of ideophones in Basque language based on Ibarretxe-Antuñano's (2006) trilingual dictionary Hizkuntzaren Bihotzean - Euskal Onomatopeien Hiztegia.

A 

  — expression for toddling children and in lullabies
  — sleep
  — go for a walk
  — expression of happiness
  — gasp of astonishment
  — cattle
 — indecisive
  — indecision.
  — stilts
  — walk, go for a walk
  — running
  — walking (especially, a little kid).
  — toddle over here.
  — drowsy sleepy man
  — foam, spray, surf
  — expression of disapproval
  — call for challenge
  — homeless
  — spider
  — gush out
  — gee up!
  — zigzag.
  — cry to start moving
  — without too many clothes.
  — ouch; call for pigs.
  —  to run.
  — bark of a small dog
  — call for geese
  — expression to get up
  — expression of happiness
  — sound of bite
  — quarrel, problem.
  — expression to set the dog on somebody
  — call for a challenge
  — leftovers

B 

  — from person to person; bluntly.
  — move clumsily.
  — hard boiling sound.
  — industrious, proud, non-stop.
  — sound of bubbling water; rhythmic falling of a light body.
  — a great deal, a lot, amply, abundantly, plentifully.
  — sound of ripping
  — move quickly.
  — wholly, completely.
  — profusely (especially grain falling and money spending).
  — tipsy, slightly drunk.
  — equally, no matter.
  — to walk by oneself.
  — clumsy.
  — call for cats.
  — flattery.
  — bubble, rounded.
  — swinging, teetering.
  — tumbling, turning over.
  — stagger, totter, reel.
  — slip, sway, rocking.
  — piled up.
  — women's fight (tearing hair out)
  — gently.
  — borborygmus; any rumbling noise
  — around.
  — call for ducks.
  — suddenly.
  — tp spread.
  — buzzing.
  — wee wee, pee pee.
  — throwing the ball to one another.
  — to be naughty.
  — melt down.
  — soaked.
  — swollen.
  — spreading.
  — sleeping.
  — big spending.
  — gushing, spurting.
  —  precipitous mountain.
  — stride purposefully.
  — walk hastily.
  — twinkle, glitter.
  — walk very fast.
  — rumour.
  — waste.
  — bumble bee humming.

D 

  — knock the door.
  — going in a hurry.
  — tremble.
  — insistently, on and on.
  — tap, stroke
  — have an idea suddenly.
  — trembling.
  — proceed drastically
  — light tremble.
  — continuous drag.
  — with difficulty.
  — the sound of something sparkling or shiny.
  — sparkle, sunbeam, gleam.
  — sparkle, glow (stars).
  — barely, hardly.
  — in big gulps.
  — to stop suddenly.
  — trot.
  — count or pay by giving the money coin by coin.
  — clumsily drink in big gulps.
  — exactly
  — sound of a firework being launched.

DZ 

  — throw something and put it into an opening or a corner.
  — not to bounce the ball as a result of hitting the angle.
  — walk slowly and swinging.
  — the sound of hitting somebody in the chest.
  — sawing sound, squeak.
  — bim bam.
  — gushing out water

E 

  — chattering.
  — walk with difficulty, trudge.
  — slow at walking
  —  keep up with difficulty.
  — without thinking
  — gossiping.
  — articulating the sound R wrongly
  — yaa! (cattle)
  — nervously.
  — exclamation used when somebody is in a difficult situation or to attract attention.
  — as a last resort.
  —  yaa! (cattle).

F 

  — light motion (sails, birds, sweat running down...)
  — very full dress
  — frivolous.
  — rustling.
  — spin clumsily.
  — walk angrily.
  — fall down in circles and slowly.
  — fray.
  — murmur.
  — soft breeze.
  — softly.
  — walk aimlessly.
  — rotative motion  of an object thrown in the air.
  — foolishly.
  — stomp around in a rage.
  — crack, crackle, crash.
  — fall into water.
  — whoosh, go across the air fast
  — not to keep one's word
  — call for hens.
  — sound the spinning wheel.

G 

  — boiling, bubbling, gushing out.
  — lazy person.
  — caw, croak, honk.
  — mature woman ready to marry the first one to appear.
  — rolling around.
  — groping in the dark.
  — weak.
  — sound of a cowbell.
  — sound of gnawing.
  — water murmur.
  — wine poured in a bottle.
  — sound of cutting hair.
  — to get upset stomach from something.
  — swallow.
  — red-hot, burning, incandescent.
  — bone crackling.

H 

  — one after another
  — pant (breath with difficulty).
  — carry stones
  — basics, rudiments.
  — profusely eating.
  — from time to time.
  — bits and scraps of bones and pork.
  — drink up in a gulp
  — hobbling.
  — bickering.

I 

  — almost.
  — otter.
  — ridicule.
  — quarrel, argument.
  — hunt around for.
  — "I Spy" game.
  — voyeur.
  — growing dark.
  — indecisive man.
  — sig of disgust and sadness.
  — beat about the bush.
  — complaint.
  — in great detail.
  — carefully.
  — tittle-tattle.
  — call for pigeons.
  — rotative motion, quick and confusing.
  — mocking laugh.
  — guffaw.
  — throw money in christening ceremonies
  — weak.
  — mischievous smile
  — whoop of joy typical of Basque shepherds when they are in the mountains, and of Basque people in general
  — smudge.
  — whispering.
  — trivialities.
  — a big hurry.
  — blindly.
  — not a word.
  — secret conversation.
  — shhh, hush.
  — chattering whispering.
  — mystery
  — oi, call for attention

J 

  — expression of skepticism.
  — steps of a procedure.
  — prancing.
  — twangy.
  — crawl

K 

  — wooden bowl for milk.
  — cry of pain (of dogs being hit)
  — cockatoo
  — cunning argument, trickery.
  — rhythmical noise.
  — millstone.
  — poppy, weed in wheat.
  — sound of bouncing ball in Jai-Alai
  — little by little.
  — guffaw; ha-ha-ha.
  — jolt, screech.
  — call for sheep and cows.
  — rat-a-tat-tat.
  — expression for keeping away a cat.
  — gesture, wink.
  — in a straight line.
  — hen's hiccups.
  — coward, intimidated.
  — staggering astride.
  — twist of rivers.
  — multicoloured.
  — tickles.
  — wobbling; unsure.
  — slip away.
  — swords fighting sound.
  — cricket sound.
  — trudge.
  — keep up with difficulty.
  — jumping or rolling on the ends of a wooden log that rolls down the hill.
  — hide-and-seek game.
  — in bites
  — joy, jubilation.
  — frog sound, croak.
  — gnashing of teeth.
  — articulating R sound wrongly.
  — champagne
  — latch.
  — central part in leather balls.
  — with difficulty.
  — rummage.
  — trinket.
  — sound of unstacking.
  — wolf down.
  — scissors' sound
  — insect's flight.
  — cut hair.
  — stop out of tiredness.
  — sound of liquid in a bottle.
  — cot sound, to rock.
  — idiot.
  — indecisive.
  — squatting, crouching.
  — carry a boy astride.
  — belch.
  — get drunk
  — drink buzz; if said to somebody, it's an invitation to do so, if the other person accepts, this one must say krak.
  — strumming.
  — griding.
  — sound of breaking small things.
  — castanet, snap
  — strawman.
  — flat corncake filled with green cheese.
  — cock-a-doodle-doo
  — kitchen job.
  — trifling.
  — nap, siesta, light sleep.
  — rhythmical sound of a cradle/cot
  — doorstop.
  — full of fruit.
  — exclamation used by children when playing
  — pig grunt, oink.
  — call for pigs.
  — that precise moment
  — a person with hunched shoulders
  — set the animals on somebody

L 

  — (game) blind man's bluff.
  — sound of dog gnawing.
  — tasteless.
  — hefty man.
  — slurp down.
  — small snowflake.
  — slip, slide
  — praises and flatteries, suck up to somebody.
  — sound of rough sea, roar
  — naive; for kids: milk (not maternal).
  — "the same old story".
  — flower.
  — singing softly to oneself.
  — sun glitter over a field.
  — bird trill.
  — sleep.
  — windward.
  — dummy.
  — put somebody off.

M 

  — slow and peacefully.
  — little by little.
  — roar of oxen.
  — land dragged by a torrent.
  — drinking water or liquid.
  — lice and fleas.
  — bug insect.
  — ghost, boogeyman.
  — whispering, mumbling.
  — snow softly and continuously.
  — gradually.
  — gulp down making noises.
  — bellowing, howling.
  — voraciously, greedily.
  — kissing.
  — sluggish.
  — big lips.
  — eating voraciously.
  — twangy.
  — completely soaked.
  — eat without appetite.
  — weak and thin.
  — not a word
  — finicky.
  — call for cats.
  — scold.
  — whisper.
  — murmur of water.
  — with one arm.

N 

  — chaos, mess.
  — confusion, mess
  — wish.
  — dull ache.
  — (kids) milk.
  — irritate.
  — twinkle.
  — with half closed eyes
  — wet nurse.

Ñ 

  — dirty trick.
  — yum-yum, (kids) to eat.
  — (kids) cheese; food.
  — offering but not giving.
  —  eating without appetite.
  —  wink
  — sound of having sex.
  — hitting a bit, fighting for fun.
  — teeny-weeny.
  —  iris.
  — short-sighted.
  — chewing.

O 

  — indigestion.
  — call for challenge; expression of anger.
  — offering.
  —  out!
  — expression of pain when burned or stuck with a needle
  —  with great difficulty.

P 

  — puffing.
  — swish.
  — walk step by step.
  — harmful animal.
  — shoot, bang.
  — hit continuously.
  — show-off.
  — doll.
  — corn or flour bread.
  — slide, glide.
  — gushing out.
  — forced smile.
  — thrown an object at a short distance.
  — pure.
  — glub-glub, slowly boiling.
  — reverse, back.
  — butterfly
  — favourite
  — elegant
  — spend money little by little.
  — continuous and hectic succession of things.
  — diarrhoea.
  — boy's game: throwing a ball.
  — tumble, rolling down.
  — coat (food, with egg and flour).
  — sound of a heavy object falling.
  — boom (fireworks).
  — breakdown, failure.
  — chubby.
  — speak quickly and continuously.
  — yuck!
  — splash.
  — bouncing.
  — pain, hurt.
  — spill.
  — slid down a slope.
  — in abundance.
  — liquid spill.
  — fart
  — get annoyed
  — blow
  — DIY, small jobs
  — kick of a harassed horse
  — blow

R 
  — strode.

S 

  — shove.
  — jumble.
  — thud.
  — transparent.
  — great shock
  — sudden action, incision
  — inserting one object into another
  — burst; sting.
  — frequently
  — devour.
  — come and go zig-zagging
  — sharply
  — non stop.
  — helter-skelter, bolt
  — gesture
  — ceremonious
  — sound of sew
  — moth
  — poor in nutrients
  — rachitic
  — mole's noise
  — sew clumsily
  — whoa!, voice to stop animals
  — sew clumsily; a rough patch.
  —  suddenly

T 

  — splish-splash, wade.
  — sound of not very audible noises (heartbeat, pocket watch...); touch, tap.
  — quick action; sudden stop.
  — groping
  — toddling, walk slowly, in short and quick steps
  — frequently, constantly
  — tick-tock, clock sound
  — swish, sound of a liquid moving inside a pitcher
  — water shaking in a container
  — wet
  — bump, hit
  — walk from one place to another
  — sound of drops
  — punctually
  — bucket in boats for bailing out
  — coin by coin; step by step; drop by drop; rhythmical noise.
  — sound of falling
  — walk with irregular steps
  — drop
  — dripping
  — big man
  — little jumps when galloping or trotting
  — sound of a person falling down into the floor
  — fall and roll down the floor
  — brazen woman
  — expression of skepticism
  — drill
  — frying pan
  — unpleasant sound.
  — sound of a cartwheel moving
  — spillage
  — sticky
  — sound of clothing ripping
  — drag
  — in an agitated state; make somebody anger; agitate
  — snap (a robe)
  — knotty wood
  — in one's free moments; in intervals.
  — once in a while
  — cry profusely
  — scorn
  — spanking
  — suddenly
  — sound of scratching
  — stammering
  — youngest child
  — offering but not giving
  — nod (sleeping)
  — hammering
  — hammering sound
  — large wave.
  — provoking.
  — stand doing nothing.
  — halt, stop.
  — upright.
  — rebel, uncontrolled, unbridled.
  — stubbornly.
  — in any way.
  — slowly, little by little.
  — in a straight line.
  — doggy.
  — idiot.
  — without thinking.
  — beating.
  — little by little, step by step.
  — worn out.
  — clang, metal sound.
  — gulp
  — small details
  — pulse
  — baby's bottle
  — run with difficulty
  — pitter-patter
  — cicada's song
  — at will
  — c'mon!
  — fall and roll down
  — tinkling
  — gnashing of teeth
  — farting
  — lagging, straggling
  — electric ring
  — plod
  — say "no" in disgust
  — sound of flute
  — hey! (addressing males)
  — get upset stomach from something, overdose on
  — toast, cheers
  — leapfrog, children's game
  — call for cows
  — walk, trot
  — slam, bang [door closing]
  — gallop
  — clumsy movement of the spinning top
  — dance and music from the Basque Country
  — walk rhythmically
  — gipsy con
  — rattle
  — press too much
  — fight tooth and nail
  — doorknocker
  — instant
  — man with a malformation who walks clumsily, running into people
  — rain buckets (a lot)
  — yuck! expression of revulsion
  — cough!
  — a combination of three cards of equal value in the card game 31
  — plug
  — loud blow
  — jump in the air
  — no way
  — waterfall, cascade
  — whistle made of plants
  — small bugle
  —  not a thing

TT 

  — yuck! (expression of disgust)
  — taking baby steps
  — sound of txalaparta
  — drag little by little
  — expression used when somebody is deceived
  — get off
  —  provoking
  — slowly and peacefully
  — handbell sound
  — liquor
  — small step by step
  — get dressed
  — small person looking around for something
  — deformed animal
  — eau-de-vie;
  — spit
  — objection
  — take it easily
  — Basque instrument from Soule, psaltery
  — Basque mardi-gras characters in Ituren and Zubieta (joaldunak)
  — carnival hat, worn by joaldunak
  — shit of sheep

TX 

  — stop tapping
  — keep upright (of children)
  — woman's cry
  — short step
  — sultry, stuffy weather
  — fast rowing regatas
  — rock the boats on the waves
  — coin
  — wooden cat, tap for barrels
  — joke
  — reckless
  — small person
  — play ducks and drakes
  — splash about barefoot
  — empty nut
  — swipe
  — punish
  — every step
  — call for women
  — small child
  — roast
  — walk slowly but with a firm step
  — clog
  — call for young donkeys
  — cry, say uncle
  — throw nuts one by one
  — simmer, slowly boil
  — coin, money
  — not a word
  — clinking of coins
  — rattle
  — good, loyal
  — chirp, tweet
  — splash about
  — shaving
  — carry a baby astride
  — to be crossed with somebody
  — skittle
  — insecure person, busybody 
  — bell, buzzer, ring
  — slide
  — slide, tobbogan, sled
  — explode, tear to pieces
  — frying crackle
  — flute
  — trample
  — look for sweets
  — Basque flute
  — chick
  — willy, wee-wee
  — bits and pieces, trinket
  — informality
  — wee, pee
  — call for attention, addressing boys
  —  dive, dipping one's head in the water
  —  drinking jug with spout and handle (see botijo)
  — puppet
  — drive mad
  — fuck, screw
  — in card game, answer to 
  — expression used in sagardotegis when a barrel is to be opened
  — spit
  — small drum
  — curl up
  — sip
  — pub crawl
  — ouch!
  — whispering, saying secrets

TZ 

  — mucus
  — baby crawl
  — loose thread; unimportant thing or person
  — log (tree)
  — rickety rickety
  — laugh sarcastically

U 

  — puff, expression of sadness
  — doubt
  — howl
  — expression of distrust
  — be up to no good
  — call for hens
  — by bargaining
  — whoa! (stop oxen)
  — expression of pain and surprise
  — flatulence
  — call to move away hens
  — idle

X 

  — whoa! (oxen)
  — slap
  — hit rhythmically
  — get undressed and wash the clothes
  — away! (for cats)
  — scratch
  — mice squeak
  — do something quickly
  — incidentally, in detail
  — making a racket, a row
  — wrinkle a bit
  — pork, pig's flesh
  — zigzag
  — whimpering, whining
  — mist
  — violin
  — tempting
  — drizzle
  — hurricane
  — diarrhea
  — spell, charm
  — plod
  — dripping
  — cry of pain
  — shepherd's game with six pebbles
  — whipping
  — pun, play of words
  — whoosh
  — quickly; instant
  — sound of squirrels
  — flash of lightning
  — despicable
  — hidden places
  — insisting
  — abracadabra
  — sip, swig
  — drink constantly

Z 

  — speak fast
  — mishmash, jumble
  — loud splash (water, mud)
  — shove
  — suddenly
  — gulp down
  — tangle
  — ugly and scruffy woman
  — indecision
  — ride, merry-go-round, carousel
  — astride
  — stinging, burning sensation
  — drink clumsily
  — walk with the legs open
  — cheer, martial song
  — downpour
  — clash, clatter
  — walk without stopping
  — sudden blow, shot
  — spigot, tap
  — insociable
  — teeter-tooter
  — rain profusely
  — old crock
  — walk on one's backside
  — cling-clang, metal things dragged
  — snap, break of a heavy object (metal, cristal)
  — heavy rain
  — pecking
  — truly
  — impression
  — fit in easily
  —  ravenously
  — in both directions
  — completely
  — in great detail
  — fresh
  — double smack
  — dirty
  — fun-loving, busybody and clumpsy person
  — spark
  — navel; umbilical cord
  — weak
  — handbell
  — not to know that to do
  — scream
  — shake a liquid in a container
  — holes and scratches
  — mess
  — wilted, shriveled, parched
  — sting, peck; pinch
  — hoop
  — bed bug
  — wrinkle
  — oath, wow, promise
  — tumbling, toppling
  —  tiny, teeny-weeny
  — parade with small drums
  — whistle, made of straw or branch bark
  — alboka, single-reed woodwind instrument
  — drink in gulps
  — skinny
  — get drunk
  — stumbling, teetering
  — water tank
  — shuffle
  — with insistence
  — crossbeam holding the bellow's at the blacksmith's
  — in earnest, putting a lot of effort
  — seriously
  — in a finicky, squeamish way
  — whining
  — complaint, groan
  — fall down suddenly
  — constantly punching
  — hang by the hands and moving legs and back
  — blow one's nose; make a child blow his nose
  — cowbell
  — honest, loyal
  — gawky
  — old small coin
  — burst with spite
  — a tap, touch in the skull
  — trudge, plod; blotch; wallop
  — throw punches left, right and centre
  — wolfing down; pell-mell, helter-skelter
  — exclamation of winning; dig, cutting remark
  — slap
  — belly
  — lively
  — splash
  — rocket
  — somersault
  — shudder
  — pushing one's way through
  — be busy with petty things
  — whey water
  — soft and continuous movement
  — drizzle
  — whirlwind, twister
  — guano, diarrhoea
  — slide down a slope (as a game)
  — Basque Mardi Gras character in Lantz
  — glide; wriggle along
  — get annoyed
  — propel
  — walk from one place to another
  — clam
  — shoe's noise when walking clumsily
  — profusion
  — sneeze
  — act without thinking
  — scribble
  — Basque mythological character from Oiartzun
  — dawn; ray, beam
  — drag a heavy object; expression used in card game mus when you get as many points as hamarrekos
  — work carelessly
  — slide; gushing out water
  — sound of saw
  — sound of red-hot-metal in contact with water
  — heavy breathing; snore
  — match a ball with a leather glove
  — decisively; resolutely
  — snap
  — beat a ball
  — word used in Mus card game
  — spinning very fast
  — tangle, mess
  — escape, disappear suddenly
  — speed, energy
  — roasted
  — bare-legged
  — food; meat
  — quick smacks
  — lisp
  — hors d'oeuvres
  — trinket, detail
  — blabbing
  — rifle
  — sound made by an incision, a puncture
  — sting several times
  — speed, quickness
  — nook, fold
  — idiot
  — to do something any old how
  — gush out
  — sharp; strict, severe
  — hiccup
  — expression used when refusing flatly
  — quick and gliding movement
  — suck, drink a liquid
  — explosion, boom
  — shut, locked
  — insert something somewhere suddenly
  — suck in, munch, crunch
  — disagreement, quarrel
  — bread and cod soup
  — rumour; whisper
  — whirlpool
  — confused, in disorder
  — snore
  — set somebody's teeth on edge
  — big shower
  — cod soup served in cider houses for sailors
  — absorbing, sipping
  — in between sips
  — in gulps
  — to be alert
  —  up!, straight
  — torch
  — whispering

See also 

 Ideophone
 Onomatopoeia
 Japanese sound symbolism
 Cross-linguistic onomatopoeias
 Trikiti
 Txalaparta
 Euskara
 Basque alphabet

References 

 Ibarretxe-Antuñano, I. 2006. Hizkuntzaren Bihotzean - Euskal Onomatopeien Hiztegia. Donostia: Gaiak.
 Ibarretxe-Antuñano, I. 2012. Análisis lingüístico de las onomatopeyas vascas . Oihenart. Cuadernos de Lengua y Literatura 27: 129–176. 
 Ibarretxe-Antuñano, I. 2017. Basque ideophones from a typological perspective . The Canadian Journal of Linguistics / Revue canadienne de linguistique 62.2: 1-21.

External links 
 Sareko Euskal Gramtika. Sinbolismo fonetiko bidez sortutako hitzak
 Buber's Basque Page

Phonaesthetics
Semiotics
Basque language
Basque culture
Onomatopoeia